Ian Boyd  is Distinguished Professor of Catholic Studies at Seton Hall University, founder and editor of The Chesterton Review, and president of the G.K. Chesterton Institute for Faith & Culture. A renowned scholar of G. K. Chesterton, he is the author of the book The Novels of G.K. Chesterton. He was born and raised in Canada and completed his Master of Arts degree at the University of Toronto and Doctor of Philosophy degree at the University of Aberdeen, Scotland. For several years, he was a professor of English at St. Thomas More College at the University of Saskatchewan. Upon the invitation of then-President Robert Sheeran, he went to Seton Hall University to work more closely with Dermot Quinn, an editor of The Chesterton Review. He has lectured extensively throughout the world on the sacramental themes and prophetic vision of Chesterton.

References

External links 
 Profile of Ian Boyd at Seton Hall University
http://www.itacaedizioni.it/autori/ian-boyd 

Seton Hall University faculty
Canadian Roman Catholic priests
Congregation of St. Basil
Living people
Year of birth missing (living people)
Academic staff of the University of Saskatchewan
Academic journal editors
Alumni of the University of Aberdeen